Carla Dupuy (born 18 September 1988) is an Argentine field hockey player. At the 2009 Champions Trophy she competed for Argentina winning the gold medal in her first senior international tournament. She was chosen as an alternate player (P accreditation) for the 2012 Summer Olympics. After a brief participation with the national team in 2013, she returned in late 2015 and won the 2014–2015 World League.

References

External links 
 

1988 births
Living people
Argentine female field hockey players
Field hockey players from Buenos Aires
Las Leonas players
South American Games gold medalists for Argentina
South American Games medalists in field hockey
Competitors at the 2014 South American Games
20th-century Argentine women
21st-century Argentine women